Clan Analogue is an Australian record label which started in 1992 as a collective by a number of individuals interested and active in electronic music and with a shared passion for analogue synthesisers and digital culture.

History 

Producer, broadcaster, DJ and artist, Brendan Palmer, was the label manager from 1992 to 1995. He helped establish the collective, originally in Sydney, including the Clan Analogue record label and organising performance events. During this period the label released vinyl extended plays, a compilation CD (Cog) and cassette tapes. Naomi Mapstone of The Canberra Times reviewed the fourth EP, which "features live, acts from Canberra and Sydney, playing rave, industrial, garage and hardcore."

Clan Analogue signed a distribution agreement with Mushroom Records' Mushroom Distribution Services by 1994. In its early years the record label published a newsletter, Kronic Oscillator, and hosted stages at two consecutive Big Day Out festivals. They established a regular club night, "Electronic", at the Bentley Bar in Sydney.

In the early years of Clan Analogue membership attracted individuals who were interested and active in electronic sound in Australia, including Palmer, Tobias Kazumichi Grime, Antony Bannister, Sharif Hansa, Garry Bradbury (Severed Heads, Size), George Soropos, Scot Art, Chris Bell, Bo Daley (Dark Network), Rosie X (Geekgirl), Nick Wilson, Jasper Russell, Seb Chan, Luke Dearnley (Sub Bass Snarl), Andy Fitzgerald, Ali Omar (Atone), Adrian Black, Lisa Bode, James McParlane, Jamie Stevens, Benj Askins (Infusion), Kate Crawford, Nicole Skeltys, Gordon Finlayson, Ian Andrews (Disco Stu), Mark Ireland (Carrier), Cindi Drennan, Justin Maynard (Tesseract), Grant Muir (VJ Morph), Roslyn McGinty (Bass Bitch), Elle Stearn (Lush Puppy), Marty Wells (Batfreak), Murray Creagh.

The collective's appeal was largely fueled by the sore lack of live venues in Australia for electronic music and a lack of options for releasing recorded material. On 25 March 1994 a live performance at the Goethe Institut, Sydney, was recorded for a video album, Clan Analogue Live (1994), with Palmer as producer.

Following Brendan's departure from the collective in 1995 to start Zonar Records, journalist, DJ and lawyer Gordon Finlayson took over as label manager of the Clan Analogue record label and the collective established a decentralised system of operations with individuals such as Scot Art, Antony Bannister, lLisa Bode, Nick Wilson, Toby Grime, Mark Ireland, Chris Bell, Bo Daley, Rick Bull (Deep Child) and Charlotte Whittingham all taking roles in managing the ongoing operations of the collective. During this period the label's output including numerous thematic compilation CDs such as Cognition, Jaunt, 20 Disco Greats, Aphelion, Solid Gold and Pre-Sense as well as solo releases from artists such as Deep Child, The Telemetry Orchestra, Nerve Agent, The 5000 Fingers of Dr T, Disco Stu, Atone and Dark Network.

In 2001 Melbourne based Nick Wilson took over the management of the Clan Analogue record label and remains the label manager until the present date. During that period Clan Analogue has continued to maintain an extensive release schedule of CDs, LPs and digital downloads with notable solo artist releases from Bleepin' J. Squawkins, Valley Forge, Winduptoys, Lunar Module and Dsico and critically acclaimed compilations such as 'Headspace: A Tribute to Severed Heads' and 'Re Cognition: The Clan Analogue Legacy Collection' released on the 20th anniversary of the formation of the collective.

Clan Analogue quickly established itself as the pioneer of electronic art in Australia, publishing EPs, LPs, CDs, Videos, DVDs, Web sites and digital downloads while also organising and promoting live electronic music. Clan Analogue and its members have also hosted various radio programs on 2SER (Electroplastique), 2MBS (The Transcendental Anaesthetic), 2RSR, FBI and RRR.

From its start Clan Analogue promoted the live electronic music and video art with events held in The Goethe Institute, The Art gallery of NSW and The Museum of Contemporary Art. Starting with small club nights, Clan soon started hosting parties that attracted hundreds and then thousands of patrons, including the pioneering club night 'Electronic', stages at festivals such as The Big Day Out and Freaky Loops and one-off events like Crunch, Transdimensional Vehicle (with psychedelic philosopher Terrence McKenna) and Thank God It's Friday.

Clan Analogue was one part of a wider, thriving electronic music scene in the 90s & 00s in Australia alongside other underground electronic collectives and crews such as the Vibe Tribe, Frigid, Punos, Club Kooky and Elefant Traks.

Since its inception, Clan Analogue has released over 30 albums directly with many more releases coming from collective members such as Deep Child, Disco Stu, Artificial, Dark Network, Atone, Lunar Module, Carrier and Telemetry Orchestra through other labels. Its stated philosophy is: "as a social circuit board, Clan enables the building of networks by providing members with access to equipment, knowledge and advice, along with the opportunity to play live and co-produce music." The release schedule as busy now as it was in the 90's, continuing to release cutting-edge electronic music, host events and foster a global community of artists involved in electronic music.

Associated artists and DJs

Atone
Ant Banister (Clan President, Mastering Engineer, Exec Producer and Public Officer 1999- present)
Brendan Palmer AKA bP (Label Manager 1992–1995)

Carrier – member of Clan Analogue
Dark Network
Deep Child
Koshowko
Lunar Module
Nerve Agent
The Telemetry Orchestra
Bleepin' J. Squawkins
Pretty Boy Crossover
Winduptoys
SS Spanky
Dsico
Deepchild
Continuum
Bass Bitch
Lush Puppy
Ding
Hashbang Spacestar
Sub Bass Snarl
Marty Batfreak
Fluffy T. Bunny
Infusion
Des Peres
Purple World
Tesseract
signal-to-noise (aka s2n2s2n)
Nick Wilson (Label Manager 2002 – present)\
Image Byte Kid
Zog

Releases

CA044: INTONE Various Artists
CA039K: THE TRUTH IN ME Koshowko
CA038: RE COGNITION – THE CLAN ANALOGUE LEGACY COLLECTION Various Artists
CA037: DOUBLE EXPOSURE Winduptoys
CA037A: SWITCH ON Winduptoys
CA036K: PROMISE Koshowko
CA036B: INVERTED – FURTHER DUB SELECTIONS Various Artists
CA036: IN VERSION Various Artists
CA036A: OVER AND OVER DUB Dsico
CA035: FLOPPY DISCO Bleepin' J. Squawkins
CA034: DOPPLER SHIFT Various Artists
CA033: LATE SET Dark Network
CA032: DEFOCUS: LOW RES PRODUCTIONS Various Artists
CA031: ANY NUMBER CAN PLAY Pretty Boy Crossover
CA030: HABITAT Various Artists
CA029: AN ENGLISHMAN IN IBIZA Disco Stu
CA028: COGNITION 4 – SOLID GOLD Various Artists
CA027: PEAR SHAPED Pear Shaped / Atone
CA026: HYMNS FROM BABYLON Deepchild
CA025: COGNITION 3 Various Artists
CA024: BUTTSQUEEZER 5000 Fingers of Dr T
CA023: G-TYPE Nerve Agent
CA022: ADULT THEMES Disco Stu
CA021: PRE-SENSE : A CONVERGENCE OF SOUTHERN HARMONIC WAVES Various Artists
CA020: COGNITION 2: TWENTY DISCO GREATS Various Artists
CA019: LIVE BETTER ELECTRICALLY Telemetry Orchestra
CA017: JAUNT 2 Various Artists
CA016: ORANGE CHROME 5000 Fingers of Dr T
CA015: CRUCIFIED, STITCHED UP AND THEN SOME Atone
CA014: COGNITION Various Artists
CA012: JAUNT Various Artists
CA011: APHELION ONE Various Artists
CA007: COG Various Artists
CA004: EP4 Various Artists
CA003: Deep Three EP Various Artists
CA002: EP2 Various Artists
CA001: EP1 Various Artists

References

External links
 
 Brendan Palmer, founder of Clan Analogue page

Australian independent record labels
Techno record labels
Record labels established in 1992
Electronic music record labels
Australian electronic musicians